Kristīne Garina is a Latvian activist who was one of the founders of the LGBT organization  in Riga and serves as its chairman of the board. She is the current president of the European Pride Organisers Association, the Brussels-based organization which plans events for EuroPride.

Early life and education
Kristīne Garina was born in Riga, Latvia. She attended the University of Latvia earning a bachelor's degree in economics and management and then completing a master's degree in international relations. Upon completing her education, Garina began working in the automobile industry.

Activism
After a wave of public homophobic acts against the LGBT community spiked when the first pride march was held in Riga in 2005, the following year, sixteen activists joined together to form . The organization, functions as an advocacy group for the community, lobbies with policy makers, and organizes pride events. Garina was selected as a board member of the organization and she works to combat open homophobia against the community. She regularly publishes articles in various newspapers and websites like Latvijas Avīze and Delfi, pointing out discriminatory policies towards gays and lesbians such as the lack of parental leave to care for children, lack of eligibility for spousal pensions, lack of equal taxation or movement as a family unit, among other issues like hate speech and support for spousal protection legislation.

In 2013, Garina was elected as chairman of the board of Mozaīka, succeeding Linda Freimane. She served as the Latvian representative for both Baltic Pride and EuroPride in 2015. That year, Mozaīka was successful in its bid for EuroPride to be held in Riga. They were able to negotiate holding the parade on Brivibas Iela (Freedom Street), a main boulevard which marchers had previously been denied permission to use for other Pride events. The success of the event, led to Garina's election to head the European Pride Organizers Association, a post she continued to hold in 2022. In 2020, because of the COVID-19 pandemic, Garina as head of the European Pride Organizers Association, and in conjunction with InterPride, created a virtual Global Pride event to allow virtual attendance.

References

Citations

Bibliography

External links 
 Kristine Garina Twitter page
 Kristine Garina LinkedIn page

Date of birth unknown
Living people
People from Riga
University of Latvia alumni
Latvian LGBT rights activists
Latvian LGBT people
Latvian women activists
21st-century LGBT people
Year of birth missing (living people)